The 2019–20 U.S. Sassuolo Calcio season was the club's seventh consecutive season in the top-flight of Italian football. The club competed in Serie A and the Coppa Italia.

Roberto De Zerbi coached the club for the second full season after replacing previous coach Giuseppe Iachini in June 2018.

Players

Squad information

Appearances include league matches only

Transfers

In

Loans in

Out

Loans out

Competitions

Serie A

League table

Results summary

Results by round

Matches

Coppa Italia

Statistics

Appearances and goals

|-
! colspan=14 style=background:#DCDCDC; text-align:center| Goalkeepers

|-
! colspan=14 style=background:#DCDCDC; text-align:center| Defenders

|-
! colspan=14 style=background:#DCDCDC; text-align:center| Midfielders

|-
! colspan=14 style=background:#DCDCDC; text-align:center| Forwards

|-
! colspan=14 style=background:#DCDCDC; text-align:center| Players transferred out during the season

Goalscorers

Last updated: 21 July 2020

Clean sheets

Last updated: 9 February 2020

Disciplinary record

Last updated: 9 February 2020

References

U.S. Sassuolo Calcio seasons
Sassuolo